Klooga training area is one of the six military training fields used by the Estonian Defence Forces. It is located in Keila Parish, Harju County.

History 
During the Soviet occupation of Estonia, Klooga training area was one of the Soviet Army motorized rifle divisions military campus with the area of 1373 ha. It appears that the 36th Guards Motor Rifle Division was based there in the late 1950s.

Establishment 
Klooga training area was established on 24 July 2008, with the Government Order No. 334 "Establishment of the Defense Forces Klooga training area."

See also 
 Keskpolügoon

References 

Military installations of Estonia
Lääne-Harju Parish
Buildings and structures in Harju County
Military installations of the Soviet Union
Military education and training in the Soviet Union